Chastity is the sexual behavior of a man or woman acceptable to the ethical norms and guidelines of a certain culture, civilization or religion.

Chastity may also refer to:

Arts and entertainment 
 Chastity (comics), a comic book
 Chastity (1923 film), an American silent drama film
 Chastity (1969 film), a film starring Cher
 Chastity (soundtrack), Cher's soundtrack album to the film
 Chastity "Chas" Dingle, a character on the British soap opera Emmerdale
Chastity Detroit, a character in the TimeSplitters video game trilogy
Chastity, the ring name of Denise Riffle, who performed as a valet in ECW and WCW

People 
 Chastity Bono (born 1969), American LGBT rights advocate, writer, actor, and former musician
 Chastity Brown (born 1982), American singer, songwriter and musician
 Chastity Dotson (born 1986), American actress
 Chastity Reed (born 1989), American basketball player

Other uses 
 Operation Chastity, an aborted World War II plan to construct an artificial harbour in Quiberon Bay, France

See also
 The law of chastity, a moral code taught by The Church of Jesus Christ of Latter-day Saints
 Chaste (Marvel Comics)